Several ships have been named :

 , lead ship of her class
 , a class of destroyers of the Imperial Japanese Navy
 , a submarine of the Imperial Japanese Navy, code-named Momi
 JDS Momi (PF-284), a Kusu-class patrol frigate of the Japan Maritime Self-Defense Force, formerly USS Poughkeepsie (PF-26)

See also 
 Momi (disambiguation)

Imperial Japanese Navy ship names
Japanese Navy ship names